Global Lake Ecological Observatory Network (GLEON) is an international grass-roots, voluntary network of researchers, educators, and community groups interested in making and utilizing time series of high-frequency observations made on and in lakes and reservoirs all over the world. GLEON includes more than 60 lake observatories and more than 850 individual members from 62 countries on six continents (as of January 2021).

Goals
The goal is to understand, predict, and communicate the impact of natural and anthropogenic influences on lake and reservoir ecosystems.  The researchers include limnologists, ecologists, information technology experts, and engineers who have a common objective of building and growing a scalable, persistent network of lake ecology observatories; developing new theoretical models based on the more extensive spatial and temporal scales of data; integrating new technologies to utilize the data; educating a new generation of researchers in team science; and engaging the public. Each lake or reservoir observatory consists of one or more instrumented platforms capable of sensing key limnological variables and moving the data in near-real time to web-accessible databases. The types of sensors employed at these observatories include: temperature, dissolved oxygen, dissolved carbon dioxide, phytoplankton pigments such as chlorophyll and phycocyanin, as well as devices that detect water movements such as acoustic Doppler current profilers (ADCP.) Many of the observatories also track meteorological parameters on the lake such as solar radiation, wind speed, and relative humidity.  Data from the network of observatories will allow a better understanding of key processes such as the effects of climate and land use change on lake or reservoir function, the role of episodic events such as typhoons in resetting aquatic dynamics, and carbon cycling within lakes and reservoirs.

Participating lakes and organizations

 Lough Feeagh, County Mayo, Ireland
 Lake Erken, Uppsala University, Sweden
 Douglas Lake, University of Michigan Biological Station, Michigan, USA
 Sparkling Lake, Wisconsin USA 
 Trout Bog Lake (Vilas County, Wisconsin)
 Crystal Bog Lake, Wisconsin, USA
 Trout Lake, Wisconsin, USA 
 Lake Mendota, Wisconsin, USA
 Lake Sunapee, New Hampshire
 Lake Rotorua, New Zealand
 Yuan-Yang Lake, Taiwan 
 Lake Kinneret, Israel 
 Chaffey Dam, Nundle, NSW
 Euiam, South Korea 
 Soyang, South Korea
 Lake Paajarvi, Lammi Finland
 Lake Annie, Lake Placid, Florida 
 Lake Taihu, Jiangsu Province, China
West Long Lake, University of Notre Dame Environmental Research Center, Michigan, USA
 Big Spirit Lake, Spirit Lake, Iowa, USA

External links
 GLEON website 
 Lake Sunapee Protective Association
 Wikiproject Lakes

Ecology organizations
Limnology
Environmental data